Spain competed at the 1982 European Athletics Championships in Athens, Greece, from 6–12 September 1982.

Medals

Results

Men
Track & road events

Field events

Women
Track & road events

Nations at the 1982 European Athletics Championships
1982
European Athletics Championships